Charles E. Larkin (born October 21, 1927) is a retired United States Coast Guard vice admiral. He served as Commander of the Coast Guard Pacific Area and 12th Coast Guard District.

References

1927 births
United States Coast Guard admirals
Living people
People from Los Angeles
Military personnel from California